Veterinarians and veterinary surgeons are medical professionals who operate exclusively on animals. This is a list of notable veterinarians, both real and fictional.

Real-life veterinarians

A
Wayne Allard (born 1943) — U.S. Senator (1997–2009)
Maurice Allen (born 1937) — veterinary pathologist

B
Chris Back (born 1950) — Australian Senator (2009–2017)
Bernhard Lauritz Frederik Bang (1848–1932) — Danish veterinarian who discovered Brucella abortus
Denis Barberet (1714–1770) — French bibliographer and author
Harold William Bennetts (1898–1970) — Australian known for research on livestock and the toxic effects of native Australian plants
Natanael Berg (1879–1957) — Swedish composer
Reidar Birkeland (born 1928) — professor at the Norwegian School of Veterinary Science
Baxter Black (1945-2022) — U.S. radio commentator
Marie-Claude Bomsel (born 1946) — wildlife expert
Alfred Boquet (1879–1947) — French veterinarian, known for his work at the Pasteur Institute in Paris
Claude Bourgelat (1712–1779) — founder of 18th-century French veterinary school
Anton Johnson Brandt (1893–1951) — professor of pathological anatomy at the Norwegian School of Veterinary Science
Chris Brown (born 1978) — known for the Australian television series Bondi Vet

C
Nelson R. Çabej (born 1939) — Albania evolutionary biologist and author
Charles J Coottes Campbell (born 1894 - 2001 British/ Commonwealth equine veterinarian 
Louis J. Camuti (1893–1981) — first American cat veterinarian
Philibert Chabert (1737–1814) — French agronomist who wrote on early treatise on anthrax control
Craig Challen — Australian diver and caver
John A. Charlton (1907–1977) — Canadian politician
Auguste Chauveau (1827–1917) — French veterinarian, in whose honor the bacterium  Clostridium chauvoei is named
Matthew Clarke (born 1973) — former professional Australian rules footballer
Ken Coghill (born 1944) — former Australian politician
Robert Cook — British equine veterinarian
Robin Coombs (1921–2006) — British immunologist, co-discoverer of the Coombs test
Harry Cooper (born 1943) — Australian television personality
Miguel Cordero del Campillo (1925–2020) — Spanish parasitologist

D
Morné de la Rey (born 1970) — South African veterinarian who was the first person in Africa to clone an animal, as well as first person to do successful IVF in Cape Buffalo in the world.
Darlene Dixon — American veterinarian and toxicologic pathologist
Sydney Dodd (1874–1926) — British veterinary surgeon who was the first lecturer in veterinary bacteriology at the University of Sydney
Peter C. Doherty (born 1940) — Australian veterinary surgeon and researcher joint recipient of the 1996 Nobel Prize in Physiology or Medicine
Mick Doyle (1941–2004) — Irish rugby player
Petrus Johann du Toit (1888–1967) — South African veterinarian
John Boyd Dunlop (1840–1921) — Scottish inventor of the tyre

E
Henrik Edland (1905–1984) — professor of anatomy at the Norwegian School of Veterinary Science
John Ensign (born 1958) — U.S. Senator (2001–2011)

F
Martin J. Fettman (born 1956) — U.S. astronaut and veterinary pathologist
Kevin Fitzgerald (born 1951) — American television documentary veterinarian
Bruce Fogle (born 1944) — Canadian veterinarian
Birger Furugård (1887–1961) — Swedish politician

G
Doug Galt — former Canadian politician
Pierre-Victor Galtier (1846–1908) — French veterinarian, notable for his research into rabies.
Hugh Gordon (1909–2002) — Australian parasitologist
John Russell Greig (1889–1963) — Scottish veterinarian, notable for his research into milk fever.
Camille Guérin (1872–1961) — developed a vaccine for tuberculosis

H
James Hallen (1829–1901) — British veterinarian who served as General Superintendent of Horse Breeding in India 
Greg J. Harrison — avian veterinarian
Susanne Hart (1927– 2010) — South African environmentalist
Antonie Marinus Harthoorn (1923–2012) — conservationist who worked in Africa 
Herbert Haupt (born 1947) — Austrian politician
James Herriot (1916–1995) — pen name of James Alfred Wight, author of books about animals
Vanessa M. Hirsch — Canadian-American veterinary pathologist and virologist
Thomas William Hogarth (1901–1999) — Scottish-Australian veterinarian, writer on dogs
John Holt (1931–2013) — Australian veterinarian and sports shooter
William Hunting (1846–1913) — founder of The Veterinary Record

J
Dawda Jawara (1924–2019) — first president of Gambia
Joan O. Joshua (1912–1993)

L
Amy K. LeBlanc — U.S. veterinary oncologist
Richard M. Linnehan (born 1957) — U.S. astronaut
Buster Lloyd-Jones (1914–1980) — British veterinary surgeon

M
Svend Lomholt (1888–1949) — Danish veterinarian 
Zoltán Magyar (born 1953) — Hungarian gymnast; gold medalist in men's pommel horse at the 1976 and 1980 Summer Olympics
Miguel Ángel J. Márquez Ruiz – Mexican veterinarian
Tracey McNamara - veterinary pathologist at the Bronx Zoo who played a pivotal role in identifying the first outbreak of West Nile Virus in the United States
Keith Meldrum (born 1937) — Chief Veterinary Officer of the United Kingdom (1988–1997)
Veranus Alva Moore (1859–1931) — Dean of Cornell University College of Veterinary Medicine (1908–1929)
Suzanne Morrow (1930–2006) — Canadian figure skater who took the Official's Oath at the 1988 Winter Olympics

N
Denis Napthine (born 1952) — Australian politician
Rich Nye (born 1944) — American professional baseball pitcher turned exotic animal/avian veterinarian

O
Peter Ostrum (born 1957) — child actor who was Charlie Bucket in the 1971 motion picture Willy Wonka & the Chocolate Factory

P
Frederick Douglass Patterson (1901–1988) — recipient of the Presidential Medal of Freedom in 1987, the highest civilian honor in the U.S.
Sonny Perdue (born 1946) — U.S. politician, former Governor of Georgia
Brian Perry (born 1946) — epidemiologist
Walter Plowright (1923–2010) — English veterinary scientist who worked to eradicate rinderpest

R
Nicky Rackard (1922–1976) — Irish hurler
Carl Gottlob Rafn (1769–1808) — Danish multi-disciplinary scientist
Robert L. Rooks — American veterinarian
John Gunion Rutherford (1857–1923) — Canadian politician

S
Suzanne Saueressig (1924–2013)  — first practicing female veterinarian in Missouri
Elmo Shropshire (born 1936) — best known as the singer of the novelty Christmas song "Grandma Got Run Over By a Reindeer"
Brian Sinclair (1915–1988) — best known for his association with James Alfred Wight who fictionalized him as Tristan Farnon
Donald Sinclair (1911-1995) - best known as partner to James Alfred Wight who fictionalized him as Sigfried Farnon
Danielle Spencer (born 1965) — actor
Harry Spira — Australian pioneer in dog breeding technologies
Leonid Stadnyk (1970–2014) — Ukrainian veterinarian renowned for his height
Harry Steele-Bodger (1896–1952) — British veterinarian
Michael G. Strain (1959–) — American veterinarian who is the incumbent Louisiana Agriculture and Forestry Commissioner

T
Arnold Theiler (1867–1936) — described the horse disease which became known as Theiler's disease
James Thomson (born 1958) — American developmental biologist who derived the first human embryonic stem cell line in 1998
Simon Fraser Tolmie (1867–1937) — Canadian politician
Debbye Turner (born 1965) — Miss America 1990, resident veterinarian for CBS' The Early Show

V
Erik Viborg (1759–1822) — Danish veterinarian and botanist

W
Hugh Wirth (1939–2018) — Australian animal welfare advocate with RSPCA Australia, radio broadcaster

Y 
Sophia Yin (1966–2014) — American animal behaviorist and pioneer of positive reinforcement training for pets.

Z
Robert Zammit — Australian television veterinarian

Fictional veterinarians
 From the British soap opera Emmerdale:
Rhona Goskirk
Max King
Paddy Kirk
Hari Prasad
Zoe Tate
From the Australian soap opera Neighbours:
Steve Parker
Gemma Ramsay 
From the children's books series The Story of Doctor Dolittle: Doctor Dolittle
From the US television series The Walking Dead: Hershel Greene
From the South Korean drama series Hey Ghost, Let's Fight: Joo Hye-sung

References

Lists of people by occupation
Lists of physicians